Arthur St. John Ryan (18 July 1935 – 8 July 2019) was an Irish businessman who was the founder, chairman, and chief executive of Primark. The company  trades under the name of Penneys in the Republic of Ireland.

Early life
Arthur Ryan was born the son of a Cork-born insurance clerk in 1935, and went to the Synge Street CBS in Dublin after moving to the city with his family. After emigrating to London, he entered the genteel world of gentlemen's tailoring as a tie buyer at Swan & Edgar. He also worked for London fashion wholesaler Carr & McDonald. From there, he returned to Dublin and a job at Dunnes Stores in Cornelscourt.

Business career
Ryan opened the first Penneys shop on Mary Street in Dublin in 1969. Subsequently, in 1974, he took the model to Britain under the new brand-name Primark to avoid legal problems with US chain JC Penney. The major turnaround came in 2005, when Primark acquired a huge portfolio of Littlewoods stores. Meanwhile, close attention to catwalk trends made it chic as well as cheap. It went from being the "shop that nobody admitted going to" to a Mecca for celebrity shoppers. It now accounts for over a third of parent company Associated British Foods' (ABF) operating profits. In 2009, Ryan gave up his day-to-day control of the firm as chief executive but became chairman instead.

Personal life 
Arthur St John Ryan was married to the former entertainer (The Swarbriggs/Alma Carroll) and had a daughter Jess Ryan. Ryan additionally had four children from his first marriage, Colin, Barry, Arthur and Alison Ryan. He was an intensely private man, living in one of Dublin's best-protected houses, he never gave interviews and was rarely seen in public without bodyguards. His great fear was kidnap – a real enough threat for Irish retail magnates during the Troubles. In 1981, the IRA snatched department store boss Ben Dunne; two years later, they tried to kidnap Galen Weston, scion of the Canadian family behind Primark's owner, food and retail conglomerate Associated British Foods (ABF). Ryan took no chances. "His daily schedule is kept secret from all but his closest aides."[5]
Ryan's son, Barry, who was 51, died while attempting to save his son and his son's girlfriend from drowning during a freak accident on 30 June 2015. Barry's son and his girlfriend also died during the rescue bid.

Death
Ryan died of a short illness on 8 July 2019, 10 days before his 84th birthday.

References

1935 births
2019 deaths
Businesspeople from County Dublin
Irish businesspeople in fashion
People educated at Synge Street CBS
20th-century Irish businesspeople